José Antonio Suarez (born 1965/1966)  is a judge for the Connecticut Appellate Court in the USA.

Education
Suarez received a Bachelor of Arts degree from the University of Dayton in 1989 and a Juris Doctor from the University of Connecticut School of Law in 1993.

Legal career
Before joining the bench, he held multiple positions within the Office of the Connecticut Attorney General.

Judicial career

Connecticut superior court 
Suarez was appointed to the superior court by Governor M. Jodi Rell in 2009. His service terminated in state court in August 2020 once he was sworn in as a judge of the Connecticut Appellate Court.

Connecticut Appellate Court 
On July 20, 2020, Governor Ned Lamont announced the appointment of Suarez to the Connecticut Appellate Court to the seat being vacated by Judge Christine Keller who was elevated to the Connecticut Supreme Court. He was sworn into office on August 12, 2020.

Personal life 
Suarez was born in Puerto Rico and moved to Connecticut with his family at the age of 11.

References

External links

1960s births
Living people
20th-century American lawyers
21st-century American judges
21st-century American lawyers
Connecticut state court judges
Hispanic and Latino American judges
Judges of the Connecticut Appellate Court
People from San Juan, Puerto Rico
Puerto Rican lawyers
Superior court judges in the United States
University of Connecticut School of Law alumni
University of Dayton alumni